Abertillery Bluebirds are a Welsh football team based in the town of Abertillery. They currently have a senior side in the Ardal Leagues South East, tier 3 of the Welsh football pyramid.

In May 2019 they returned to the Welsh Football League, gaining promotion from the Gwent County League. having last played in the league in the 2013–14 season.

Honours
 Ardal SE – Runners-up: 2021–22
 Welsh Football League Division Two - Runners-up: 2009–10
 Gwent County League Division One – Champions (2): 2008–09; 2018–19
 Gwent County League Division One – Runners-up  2017–18
 Gwent County League Division Two – Champions:  2006–07
 Gwent County League Division Three – Runners-up:  2000–01
 Gwent County FA Amateur Cup – Winners: 2005–06, 2006–07, 2008–09
 Gwent County Motors Cup – Winners: 2017–18
 Gwent Senior Cup – Winners: 2017–18

References

External links
 Official website

Football clubs in Wales
Sport in Monmouthshire
Abertillery
Welsh Football League clubs
Gwent County League clubs
Ardal Leagues clubs